Harrisdale Senior High School is an Independent Public secondary school in the City of Armadale, located at Laverton Crescent in Harrisdale, a suburb  south of Perth, Western Australia.

Overview
Harrisdale Senior High School opened at the start of the 2017 school year. The school's name bucked the trend of new public secondary schools in Western Australia having "College" in their name. The principal stated that the community chose the name as the school "wanted to be easily recognised as the public school in an area that had a number of private colleges".

In February 2020, the second and final stage of construction of Harrisdale Senior High School opened. Additions in this stage included 30 classrooms, three seminar rooms, specialist facilities for visual art, media and dance, a lecture theatre and a hockey pitch.

In 2021, Harrisdale Senior High School commenced a Gifted and Talented Education (GATE) program, one of only 24 such programs in Western Australia. The program is open to 32 students in each year. Sue Ellery, the state's Minister for Education stated that the government wanted schools offering GATE programs to be evenly spread across Perth. At the time, there was a large share of GATE schools in the inner metropolitan region.

Student numbers

See also

 List of schools in the Perth metropolitan area

References

External links

Public high schools in Perth, Western Australia
Educational institutions established in 2017
2017 establishments in Australia
Harrisdale, Western Australia